Pondicherry Textile Labour Union, a trade union of textile workers in Puducherry, India. PTLU is affiliated to the All India Trade Union Congress. The secretary of PTLU is V.S. Abishegam.

Trade unions in India
All India Trade Union Congress
Textile industry of India
Textile and clothing trade unions